Lillaz  is a frazione in the Province of Aosta in the Aosta Valley region of Italy.

Frazioni of Aosta Valley
Cogne